"Add oil" is a Hong Kong English expression used as an encouragement and support to a person. Derived from the Chinese phrase Gayau (or Jiayou), the expression is literally translated from the Cantonese phrase. It is originated in Hong Kong and is commonly used by bilingual Hong Kong speakers. 

"Add oil" can be roughly translated as "Go for it". Though it is often described as "the hardest to translate well", the literal translation is the result of Chinglish and was added to the Oxford English Dictionary in 2018.

Etymology and history 

In Cantonese, gā means "add", and yáu means "oil" or "fuel". It is cited that the Cantonese term originated as a cheer at the Macau Grand Prix during the 1960s. It was used to imply stepping harder on the gas pedal, giving the car more speed and power to accelerate. It is also a metaphor of injecting fuel into a tank. It was then used as an "all purpose cheer", and used exclusively in both Mandarin Chinese and Cantonese Chinese.

The romanized Cantonese ga yau and literal translation phrase add oil was commonly used since then due to the large number of bilingual Hongkongers. Instead of using the romanised Cantonese, it is reported that the English phrase was used more commonly by young Hongkongers. The increasing use of text-based online communications also contributed to the usage of the English expression.

In October 2018, due to its popularity in English speakers, "Add oil!" was officially added to the online edition of the Oxford English Dictionary. The entry recognises it as Hong Kong English, and verified that the usage of the phrase can be traced back to 1964.

Usage 

The phrase is a versatile expression typically used in encouraging and supporting speeches. For example, "Add oil, you can do it!". It is also commonly used during sports matches, to encourage athletes to perform well. 

The phrase gained its international attention when it was used in the Umbrella revolution in 2014. Local artists set up the "add oil machine", a wall along Gloucester Road. It was used to encourage international supporters to put down supporting messages to the protesters. 

The term was also used extensively during the Hong Kong protests in 2019–20. Both Add oil in English and Gayau in Cantonese was written in notes stuck to Lennon Walls as messages in support.

Related terms
Elsewhere in East Asia, terms used similarly to add oil are the Japanese Ganbatte!,  Korean Paiting!, and  Filipino .

References 

Cantonese words and phrases
English phrases
Culture of Hong Kong
Chinglish